Stężyca  is a village in Ryki County, Lublin Voivodeship, in eastern Poland. It is the seat of the gmina (administrative district) called Gmina Stężyca.

The village has a population of 2,000, and is located in northeastern corner of the historic province of Lesser Poland. In the early Kingdom of Poland and the Polish–Lithuanian Commonwealth, Stężyca was a major urban center of Lesser Poland’s Sandomierz Voivodeship, and the seat of a powiat (county). The village was first mentioned in the 12th century, for hundreds of centuries it was the center of the Land of Stężyca (ziemia stężycka). It was granted Magdeburg rights in 1330 from King Casimir the Great, losing its town charter in 1875, as a punishment for January Uprising. Until the Partitions of Poland, Stężyca belonged to Sandomierz Voivodeship, and from 1815 to 1918 it was part of Russian-controlled Congress Poland.

In the late Middle Ages, Stężyca was spelled as Stanzitia (1325–1327), Stazicza (1365), Stanzicza (1441), and Sthezicza (1569). The early settlement was founded near a fortified gord, which guarded the Vistula river crossing. Its name probably comes from ancient Polish word "stężyć", which means "to strengthen". In the spring of 1575, after the escape of King Henry of Poland and France, the town was the seat of the so-called "Stężyca Sejm" (May 12 - June 4, 1575). The village has a Gothic church of St. Martin (1434).

References

Villages in Ryki County
Sandomierz Voivodeship
Lublin Governorate
Warsaw Voivodeship (1919–1939)